Traditionally, Jewish law has not allowed women to lead the prayer service in the synagogue. Even the Reform movement did not train female cantors until the early 1970s. A chazante is a woman performing cantoral music outside the synagogue.  The word is a Yiddish declension of chazan (Hebrew and Yiddish for cantor), to the feminine.

Chazantes generally performed cantorial music outside the synagogue. Famous chazantes in the mid 20th century include: Betty Simonoff, Liviya Taychil, Sabina Kurtzweil, Sophie Kurtzer, Perele Feyg, Jean Gornish and Freydele Oysher. Most of the chazantes followed the tradition of their male counterparts and played up their European pedigrees by adopting nicknames like "Di Odesser chazante" (The Odessa chazante) or "Di Ungarishe chazante" (The Hungarian chazante).

The term chazaneet is a more recent one referring to a woman leading the prayer services.  In recent decades, both the reform and conservative communities have allowed women to lead services.  Betty Robbins was possibly the first female cantor in 1955 though Barbara Ostfeld-Horowitz is usually given that distinction since her investiture at the Hebrew Union College in 1975.  Orthodox Partnership minyanim permit women to lead parts of the prayer services, though such minyanim remain controversial within the Orthodox community, with more traditional and centrist Orthodox rejecting their place in Orthodoxy.

See also
 Role of women in Judaism
 Jewish feminism
 Religious Jewish music

External links
Article on Sophie Kurtzer, known as "Sheindele di Chazante"
Contributions of Jewish Women to Music and Women to Jewish Music

References

Jewish law and rituals
Jewish music
Judaism and women
Jewish services